Kazimieras Simonavičius University (previously: Vilnius Academy of Business Law (VABL)) is a private, state-accredited research university in Vilnius, Lithuania. The Ministry of Education and Science of the Republic of Lithuania licensed the former Vilnius Academy of Business Law on August 26, 2003. Teaching started in 2004. In 2012, the university changed its name to honour Kazimierz Siemienowicz (ca. 1600–1651), a military engineer, artillery specialist, and pioneer of rocketry.

History

The university was established as the Vilnius Academy of Business Law in 2003 and expanded to Klaipėda in 2004. In 2012, the university merged with the Business Management Academy, became member of the Erasmus exchange programme, and changed its name to Kazimieras Simonavičius University.

On 26 April 2012, the Senate of Kazimieras Simonavičius University held its inaugural meeting. Prof. Dr.  was elected the first President of the Senate and Prof. Dr.  the first Vice-President of the Senate. As of May 2022, the incumbent President of the Senate is Prof. Dr. Steffen Roth.

On 27 March 2013, KSU completed the acquisition of the Academy of Business and Management. The University took over the VVA Business Management study programme.

As of 2018, the International Children's University "Alfa" is operating at Kazimieras Simonavčius University.

International Partnerships in Higher Education 

The University has student exchange agreements with over 100 universities all over the world. KSU offers multiple opportunities for students and academics to participate in foreign professional training's and educational projects. Each semester there are compulsory and optional courses, which are taught by foreign academics from all over the world.

Location 

The main campus of Kazimieras Simonavičius University is located in Vilnius, and the university maintains a second campus in Klaipėda.

Academics 

The university offers state-accredited programmes in the fields of law, communication, economics, and social sciences, and has the right to award PhD degrees.

Current programmes include: Aviation Management; Business Management; Creative and Cultural Industries; Creativity Economy Entertainment and Tourism Industries; Entrepreneurship and Management; Fashion Industry; Geopolitical Strategy, Foresight and Strategic Management; Integrated Creativity Communication; International Business Law; Internet Engineering; Law and Economic Security; LL.M in European Union Law; LL.M in International Trade and Business Law; Marketing and Advertising; MBA (Master of Business Administration); Organizational Innovation And Management; Political Communication and Journalism; and Sociology.

Notable faculty

 Prof. Dr. habil. , former Rector 
 Prof. Dr. Viktoras Bolotinas, Technology Faculty
 Prof. Dr. habil. , Economics and Management Faculty
 Assoc. Prof. Dr. Raimundas Kalesnykas, Law Faculty
 Assoc. Prof. Dr. Austė Kiškienė, former Rector
 Andrius Navickas, journalist und politician
 Prof. Dr. Dr. habil. Steffen Roth, President of the Senate
 Assoc. Prof. Dr. Gintautas Šulija, Law Faculty

References

Universities and colleges in Vilnius
Business schools in Lithuania
Law schools in Lithuania
Educational institutions established in 2004
2004 establishments in Lithuania